Carsten Bohn (born 18 August 1948) is a German drummer and composer.  He was the drummer for the German progressive rock band Frumpy from 1969 to 1972 and had a long career in the German music scene.

He has recorded with Peter Baumann (ex-Tangerine Dream) and played as Drummer with the Jan Hammer Band

Biography
Already in his youth he performed at Hamburg's legendary Star-Club (where the Beatles started out), acting as the drummer in a variety of bands that gained a measure of local popularity. His breakthrough in Europe came in 1970 with Frumpy.

The funky lounge sound of Carsten Bohn's soundtrack music for children's audio story books from the 1970s and 1980s has long been a hit in Germany. Between 1970 and 1972, Carsten Bohn was the leader and drummer of Frumpy, the German "Kraut Rock" band headlined by the Hamburg-born blues singer Inga Rumpf.

Bohn was already a fixture in the German music business when, as BERT BRAC, he began composing music for audio story books. The music accompanying the audiobooks became just as popular as the stories themselves. Bohn's work was concentrated on multiple audio book series in which he left his own mark with his music.

The record labels responsible for the audio story books, without Bohn's knowledge or permission, used his work to accompany the story telling in at least 16 audio book series totalling approximately 170 individual episodes. Bohn engaged Europa Records in a legal battle for copyright infringement that continues today, with the result that neither the record label nor Bohn were allowed to publish the original music used for the audio books. The publishers of the old audio books had to re-record them with new music not composed by Bohn. This resulted in a full-blown run by fans on the early editions of Bohn's vinyl recordings. Special editions from that time, featuring full-length versions of Bohn's music, are sought-after collectors' items. In Germany, the original vinyl LP of some of his recordings can command very high prices, in the region of $US 250.  In addition, communities of fans took the trouble to remaster the new audio books, replacing "alien music" with songs from Bohn's older creations, and distributed them in a private pool.

 
In 1973, Bohn formed the group Dennis, named after his son born in 1971

Between 1977–1981 Bohn formed Carsten Bohn's Bandstand and recorded 3 LP's with different lineups. He was member (drummer) of the Jan Hammer Band between 1982 and 1983 along with Colin Hodgkinson and Jack Bruce, touring the US and Europe.

Bohn has attempted twice to reform Frumpy, once in 1976, and once in 1989. The 1989 revival resulted in the release of two studio albums, and a live album in 1995.

In 2004, Bohn and his band, Carsten Bohn's Bandstand, re-recorded the audio book music released by his own BigNoteRecords label, for re-release. Vol. I & II of a planned CD trilogy series were issued in 2004 and 2005 respectively. The songs therein feature Bohn's signature lounge beat which enjoy cult status among followers. For these re-recordings, the same instruments and equipment used to make the original recordings were used in order to replicate the original 1970s' and 1980s' recorded performances as closely as possible.

Carsten Bohn now composes and records music for films.

Discography

Frumpy 

 All will be changed, 1970
 Frumpy 2, 1971
 By the Way, 1972
 Frumpy LIVE, 1973
 Now!, 1990
 News, 1991
 Frumpy (live '95), 1995

Other Projects

 Zabba Lindner - Vollbedienung of Percussion, 1973
 Dennis - Hyperthalamus, 1973
 A.R.Machine - A.R.4, 1974
 Kickbit Information - Bitkicks, 1975
 P. Baumann - Repeat Repeat, 1981
 Georgie Red - We'll Work It Out, 1986
 Georgie Red - Helpless Dancer, 1987
 Udo Lindenberg - Atlantic Affairs 2001

Carsten Bohn's Bandstand 

 Humor Rumor, 1977
 Mother Goes Shoes, 1978
 C.B. Radio, 1979
 New York Times, (Solo), 1993
 Brandnew Oldies Vol.1, 2004
 Brandnew Oldies Vol.2, 2005
 Brandnew Oldies LIVE - Limited Fan-Edition (DVD), 2006
 Brandnew Oldies LIVE,Hamburg,02.10.04 (DVD+CD), 2006
 Brandnew Oldies Vol.3, 2009
 Brandnew Oldies Vol.4, 2018

References

External links 

 Official Website
 Fansite (German)
 Dispute with EUROPA (German)
 Annette Bastian "Kassettenkinder", Kapitel 4, S.88 "
 Drei Fragezeichen Folge 29 (German)
 H.G.Francis Grusel-Serie Folge 15 (German)
 Wikinews: "Verlorene Hörspielmusik" erscheint nach 20 Jahren auf CD (German)
 Interview 2005

1948 births
Living people
Musicians from Hamburg
Krautrock